Ci County or Cixian is a county of Hebei, China. It is under the administration of Handan City.

Administrative Divisions
Towns:
Cizhou, Xiguanglu, Gaoyu, Yuecheng, Guantai, Lintan, Huangsha, Baitu, Jiangwucheng

Townships:
Lucunying Township, Guyi Township, Xinzhuangying Township, Huaguanying Township, Shicunying Township, Nancheng Township, Taicheng Township, Taoquan Township, Dudang Township, Jiabi Township

Climate

Notable natives
 Huang Hua, former Minister of Foreign Affairs

References

External links

County-level divisions of Hebei
Handan